Maganik is a mountain range in Central Montenegro.

Features

Maganik is 20 km long and 10 km wide mountain range, located in central Montenegro. It is bordered by Zeta, Morača and Mrtvica rivers.

The geological composition of Maganik is made of cretaceous limestone. The base of the mountain range from the Nikšić side and the Morača River valley is made up of Triassic limestone. The canyon slopes of the river Mrtvica are formed by Triassic, Jurassic and cretaceous limestone, which created a rich vertical jaggedness to the Maganik mass. Its relief is enriched with deep karst hollows, valleys and funnel-shaped depressions. The rock formations are razor-sharp on some places. Thus, Maganik is considered one of the most demanding and inaccessible mountaineering destinations in Montenegro.

Peaks

The highest peaks of Maganik are:

 Međeđi Vrh 
 Petrov Vrh 
 Babin Zub 
 Žuta Greda 
 Rogođed 
 Kokotov Vrh 
 Cakmakov Vrh

1973 aircrash incident

On 11 September 1973, Jat Airways Sud Aviation SE-210 Caravelle 6-N (YU-AHD) flew into the Babin Zub peak while attempting to start the descent towards the Titograd Airport. All 41 people on board were killed.

External links
 SummitPost: Maganik

Mountains of Montenegro
Two-thousanders of Montenegro